The Human Pyramid may refer to:
The Human Pyramid (1899 film), by George Méliès
The Human Pyramid (1961 film), by Jean Rouch